This was the first edition of the tournament.

Arianne Hartono and Olivia Tjandramulia won the title, defeating María Lourdes Carlé and Julieta Estable in the final, 6–4, 2–6, [10–7].

Seeds

Draw

Draw

References
Main Draw

ITF World Tennis Tour Maspalomas - Doubles